Syd Jackson (born 1 July 1944) is a former Australian rules footballer who played with the Carlton Blues during the 1970s. He usually played in the centre or half forward flank.

An Indigenous Australian, Jackson was a Stolen Generations child and was adopted by Ern Manea. He started his professional footballing career at East Perth in 1963. He was equal first in that year's Sandover Medal count although he was ineligible due to suspension and in 1966 he was named East Perth's best and fairest.

Jackson made his debut with Carlton in 1969 after being recruited by Ron Barassi. He won premierships in the Blues in 1970 and 1972. His jumper number was 5.

He was exonerated by the tribunal after striking Lee Adamson, with the tribunal accepting that he was racially provoked.   At the Tribunal hearing Jackson had allowed Carlton's advocate to imply provocation to explain a fight with Adamson. Twenty-two years later he explained that there had been no provocation; Carlton president George Harris had devised the defence to ensure that the talented Jackson was available to play in the grand final. Adamson is quoted as saying he blamed Harris who 'set it up and I have despised him ever since for what he did', but Jackson must share the blame for the vilification of Adamson.

References

External links

1944 births
Australian rules footballers from Western Australia
Carlton Football Club players
Carlton Football Club Premiership players
East Perth Football Club players
Indigenous Australian players of Australian rules football
Living people
People from Bunbury, Western Australia
South Bunbury Football Club players
Two-time VFL/AFL Premiership players